Peragallo is a surname. Notable people with the name include:
 John Peragallo Jr. (1932–2008), American businessman, president of the Peragallo Pipe Organ Company
 Nilda (Nena) Peragallo (living), the Dean and Professor of the School of Nursing and Health Studies at the University of Miami, Florida